Miramella is a small genus of short-horned grasshoppers in the subfamily Melanoplinae. They are found in Europe and eastern Asia. , Orthoptera Species File lists seven species in three subgenera. The genus was first named in 1932. Miramella is the type genus of the subtribe Miramellina (Acrididae: Melanoplinae: Podismini).

The conservation status of three species have been assessed on the IUCN Red List—Miramella carinthiaca, M. irena, and M. alpina. They are each listed as species of "least concern".

Subgenera and species
Subgenera and species include:
 Subgenus Galvagniella Harz, 1973 (southeastern Europe)
 Miramella albanica Mistshenko, 1952 – Balkan Mountain grasshopper
 Subgenus Kisella Harz, 1973 (western and central Europe)
 Miramella alpina (Kollar, 1833) – green mountain grasshopper
 Miramella carinthiaca (Obenberger, 1926) – Karinthian Mountain grasshopper (southeastern Alps)
 Miramella irena (Fruhstorfer, 1921) – long-winged mountain grasshopper (southeastern Alps)
 Subgenus Miramella Dovnar-Zapolskij, 1932 (eastern Asia)
 Miramella changbaishanensis Gong, J., Z. Zheng & Lian, 1995
 Miramella rufipenne Chang, K.S.F., 1940
 Miramella solitaria (Ikonnikov, 1911), type species of the genus, as Podisma solitaria (Korea, far east Russia, northeastern China)

Genera with species formerly considered part of Mirabella include Capraiuscola, Nadigella, Parapodisma, Podisma, and Sinopodisma.

References

External links
 

Melanoplinae
Caelifera genera
Orthoptera of Europe
Orthoptera of Asia